The following lists events that happened in 2011 in Finland.

Incumbents
President – Tarja Halonen
Prime Minister – Mari Kiviniemi, Jyrki Katainen

Events
17 April – 2011 Finnish parliamentary election
15 May – Finland wins the IIHF world Championship for the second time since 1995
16 October – the 2011 Ålandic legislative election
26 December – Tapani was dubbed the worst storm in Finland in 10 years.

Full date unknown
TangaReef travel booking company is founded in Helsinki.

Deaths

11 February – Bo Carpelan, poet (b. 1926)
26 March – Yrjö Hietanen, sprint canoer (b. 1927).
27 May – Jukka Toivola, long-distance runner and chemist (b. 1949).
12 June – Kati-Claudia Fofonoff, writer and translator (b. 1947)
5 July – Mika Myllylä, cross country skier (b. 1969)
7 August – Harri Holkeri, statesman, Prime Minister of Finland 1987–1991, speaker of the UN General Assembly 2000–2001 (b. 1937)
25 October – Sinikka Keskitalo, long-distance runner (b. 1951).
5 November – Hannu Haapalainen, ice hockey player (b. 1951)
8 November – Lauri Sutela, military officer (b. 1918)

References

 
2010s in Finland
Finland
Finland
Years of the 21st century in Finland